Pleasant Ridge United Baptist Church is a historic Baptist church located at the junction of MO P and Woodruff Road in Weston, Platte County, Missouri.  It was built in 1844, and is a one-story, rectangular, brick building.  It measures approximately 35 feet by 51 feet, and has a front gable roof.  Located on the property is the Pleasant Ridge Cemetery with graves dating from 1848.

It was listed on the National Register of Historic Places in 2002.

References

Baptist churches in Missouri
Churches on the National Register of Historic Places in Missouri
Churches completed in 1844
Buildings and structures in Platte County, Missouri
National Register of Historic Places in Platte County, Missouri